Robert Black (born March 16, 1956) is an American double bassist, electric bassist, improvisor, and educator.

Career 
A student of Gary Karr, Black has performed with the Hartford Symphony Orchestra, the Ciompi and Miami String Quartets and the orchestras of the Monadock and Moab Festivals. He is a founding member of the Bang on a Can All-Stars. As a solo and chamber musician, Black has collaborated with and commissioned artists as diverse as John Cage, Evan Ziporyn, Julia Wolfe, Michael Gordon, David Lang, Meredith Monk, DJ Spooky amidst a slew of others.

Black lives in Hartford, Connecticut and is currently on the faculty of the University of Hartford Hartt School and the Manhattan School of Music.

References

Contemporary classical music performers
Living people
University of Hartford Hartt School faculty
Manhattan School of Music faculty
1956 births
Musicians from Denver